Autographa buraetica is a moth of the family Noctuidae. It is found in north and north-eastern Germany, Scandinavia, Poland, Russia (from the Ural to the Pacific coast), Mongolia, Sibiria, the Ussuri region, Korea and Japan. It has recently been recorded from Austria. In North America, it is found in Alaska, the Yukon, the Northwest Territories and British Columbia.

The wingspan is 35–42 mm.

External links
Swedish Moths and Butterflies
listing at mothphotographersgroup
Autographa buraetica (STAUDINGER, 1892), neu für Österreich(Lepidoptera, Noctuidae, Plusiinae)

Plusiini
Moths of Europe
Moths of Asia
Moths of North America
Moths described in 1892